2,4,6-Trichloroaniline is a chemical compound with a formula of C6H4Cl3N. It is useful as an intermediate in chemical reactions.

Preparation 
2,4,6-Trichloroaniline can be prepared by reaction of dry aniline with chlorine gas while in an anhydrous solution of carbon tetrachloride. 2,4,6-Trichloroaniline precipitates from solution as a white solid. If water is introduced to the solution the white material will polymerize to form aniline black.

Safety 
Occupational exposure to 2,4,6-trichloroaniline may occur through inhalation and dermal contact with this compound at workplaces where 2,4,6-trichloroaniline is produced or used (SRC). The general population may be exposed to 2,4,6-trichloroaniline via drinking water and dermal contact with this compound in dyestuffs, pigments, and pesticides containing 2,4,6-trichloroaniline. 2,4,6-trichloroaniline can be toxic when inhaled or ingested orally. The lethal dose is 2400 mg/kg for a rat.

Upon heating, 2,4,6-trichloroaniline will not undergo combustion, but may release hydrogen chloride, nitrogen oxides or carbon monoxide.

References 

Anilines
Chlorobenzenes